Agoraios or Agoraeus can refer to several things:

Agoraeus, an epithet of several gods of Greek mythology
Altar of Zeus Agoraios
Agoraios Kolonos, in ancient times a meeting place for Athenian craftsmen